Burkholderia stabilis is a species of bacteria.

References

External links
 Burkholderia LPSN - J.P. Euzéby: List of Prokaryotic names with Standing in Nomenclature

Type strain of Burkholderia stabilis at BacDive -  the Bacterial Diversity Metadatabase

Burkholderiaceae
Bacteria described in 2000